Prisonworld is the debut studio album by the German folk metal band Lyriel. It contains mostly balladesque songs.

Concept
The song "Lind e-huil" is sung in Sindarin, one of the fictional Elvish languages created by J. R. R. Tolkien. "The Symmetry of Disfiguration" was inspired by Wendy and Richard Pini's Elfquest series.

Reception

The Sonic Seducer and Rock Hard magazines interpreted the album as a tribute to Blackmore's Night. The latter review observed that while the album had been produced well the songs lacked a certain amount of pressure and did not really correspond to the Metal genre. Metal Hammer Germany compared singer Jessica Thierjung's voice to Doro Pesch and observed a frequent "Celtic mood" that was caused by the string instruments.

Track listing

Personnel
Linda Laukamp - vocals, cello
Claudia Schäfer - violin
Martin Ahmann - keyboards
Jessica Thierjung - vocals
Daniel de Beer - drums
Sven Engelmann - bass
Oliver Thierjung - guitars, backing vocals

Additional personnel
Jessica Alterauge - cover art
Christoph Weller - layout, design

References

Lyriel albums
2005 debut albums